Doerr is a respelling of Dörr, a German surname. Notable people with the surname include:

Anthony Doerr (born 1973), American writer
Bobby Doerr (1918–2017), American baseball player and coach
Harriet Doerr (1910–2002), American writer
John Doerr (born 1951), American businessman
Robert Doerr (c. 1914 – 2013), American politician and educator
Steve Doerr (born 1959), American soccer player
Susan Doerr (born 1945), American swimmer
Thomas Doerr (born 1964), American architect and writer

See also
Dorr (disambiguation)

German-language surnames